Pygarctia lorula is a moth in the family Erebidae. It was described by Harrison Gray Dyar Jr. in 1914. It is found in the US state of New Mexico.

The wingspan is 32–43 mm. Adults have been recorded on wing in July.

References

Arctiidae genus list at Butterflies and Moths of the World of the Natural History Museum

Moths described in 1914
Phaegopterina